The Papua New Guinea Council of Churches (PNGCC) is a Christian ecumenical council in Papua New Guinea. 

The Council has four major programs: 
Social Concerns Desk
Women's Desk
Theological programs
Administration

Its members comprise:
Anglican Church of Papua New Guinea
Gutnius Lutheran Church (affiliated with the Lutheran Church–Missouri Synod)
Independent Fundamental Baptist
Roman Catholic Church
Evangelical Lutheran Church of Papua New Guinea
United Church in Papua New Guinea and the Solomon Islands
Salvation Army

See also
National Council of Churches in Australia
World Council of Churches

Churches in Papua New Guinea
Papua